This is a partial list of known or supposed Italian loanwords in English. A separate list of terms used in music can be found at List of Italian musical terms used in English:

Music

Acciaccatura
Adagio
Allegretto
Allegro
Alto
Andante
Appoggiatura
Aria
Arpeggio
Assolo
Ballerina and prima ballerina
Baritone (from Italian baritono – from Greek βαρύτονος – through French)
Bass (from Latin bassus, influenced by Italian basso)
Basso
Bel canto
Bravo
Bravura
Brio
Cadenza
Cantata
Castrato 
Celesta
Cello (from Italian violoncello)
Coda
Coloratura
Concert (from Italian concerto through French)
Concertante
Concerto
Continuo
Contralto
Contrapuntal (Italian: contrappuntistico)
Cornetto
Crescendo
Diminuendo
Diva
Duet (from Italian duetto through French)
Duo
Falsetto
Fantasia
Fermata
Fiasco (whose Italian basic meaning is 'flask, bottle')
Finale
Forte
Fortissimo
Glissando
Impresario
Intermezzo
Largo
Legato
Librettist (Italian: librettista)
Libretto
Madrigal (Italian: madrigale)
Maestro
Mandolin (from Italian mandolino through French)
Mezzo-soprano (in Italian without hyphen)
Obbligato
Oboe
Ocarina
Opera
Operetta
Oratorio
Pianissimo
Piano
Piccolo (in Italian means 'small')
Pizzicato
Prestissimo
Presto
Prima ballerina
Prima donna
Quartet (from Italian quartetto through French)
Quintet (Italian: quintetto)
Scherzo (in Italian means 'joke')
Semibreve
Sextet (Italian: sestetto)
Sol-fa, solfa, solfeggio, solfège (the last one through French)
Solo (in Italian means 'alone')
Soloist (Italian: solista)
Sonata
Soprano
Sotto voce (in Italian it literally means 'under the voice' i.e. 'in a low voice'; often written without spaces)
Staccato
Tarantella (after the city of Taranto)
Tempo (in Italian means 'time')
Timpani (Italian timpano, pl. timpani)
Toccata
Tremolo
Trio
Trombone
Vibrato
Viola
Violin (from Italian violino through French)
Violoncello
Virtuoso

Art and architecture
Antics (from Italian antico, meaning 'old, ancient')
Apartment (from Italian appartamento through French appartement)
Arabesque (from Italian arabesco through French arabesque)
Architrave
Archivolt (Italian: archivolto)
Balcony (from Italian balcone)
Bas-relief (from Italian bassorilievo through French)
Belvedere (in Italian means a view point)
Bust (from Italian busto through French)
Cameo (Italian: cameo or cammeo)
Campanile
Caricature (from Italian caricatura through French)
Carton (from Italian cartone through French)
Cartoon (from Italian cartone through French)
Chiaroscuro (from chiaro-oscuro 'light-dark', an art technique making strong use of bold shadow and harsh lighting)
Corridor (from Italian corridoio through French)
Cupola
Dado (in Italian meaning 'dice')
Fresco (Italian: affresco from the expression a fresco)
Gesso
Graffiti (Italian: graffito, pl. graffiti)
Grotto (in Italian grotta, meaning 'cave')
Impasto
Intaglio
Loggia (from French loge)
Madonna (in Medieval Italian meant Lady, in Modern Italian indicates Mary the Virgin)
Magenta (after the Italian town)
 Mezzanine (Italian mezzanino, from mezzano 'middle')
Modello (Italian modello 'model, sketch')
Moresco 
Parapet (from Italian parapetto through French)
Patina
Patio
Pergola
Piazza
Pietà (in Italian means 'pity')
Portico
Putto (Italian putto 'baby', 'cherub')
Replica (in Italian means 'repeat performance')
Sgraffito (Italian sgraffiare 'to scratch, write')
Stucco (in Italian means 'plaster')
Tempera
Terra-cotta (in Italian without hyphen)
Terrazza (in Italian means 'terrace', 'balcony')
Torso
Veranda
Villa

Literature and language
Canto (from canto 'song', originally from Latin. A section of a long or epic poem)
Ditto (Old Italian for 'said')
Lingua franca (Italian lingua Franca, 'Frankish language', its usage to mean a common tongue originated from its meaning in Arabic and Greek during the Middle Ages, whereby all Western Europeans were called 'Franks' or Faranji in Arabic and Phrankoi in Greek)
Motto (Italian motto 'word')
Novel (Italian novella 'tale')
Ottava rima
Rodomontade (from Rodomonte, a character in Italian Renaissance epic poems Orlando innamorato and its sequel Orlando furioso)
Sestina
Sonnet (from Italian sonetto through French)
Stanza

Theatre and dramatic arts
Cantastoria (from canta historia 'sung story' or 'singing history', a theatrical form, in modern Italian: cantastorie)
Commedia dell'arte
Extravaganza (in Italian stravaganza, meaning 'extravagance')
Finale, Series finale
Imbroglio (in Italian means 'cheat')
 Mask (from Italian maschera though Middle French masque, from Medieval Latin masca 'mask, specter, nightmare'.
Punch (from the Italian character Pulcinella)
Scenario (in Italian also meaning 'scenery')
Sotto voce (Italian sottovoce 'in a low voice')

Arts in general and aesthetics
Burlesque (from Italian burlesco through French)
Capriccio: From capriccio 'sudden motion'. In music, a free composition; in art, a juxtaposing of elements to create a fantastic or imagined architecture
Cinquecento (Italian Cinquecento from millecinquecento '1500') The culture of the 16th century
Grotesque (from Italian grottesco through French)
Pastiche (from Italian pasticcio through French)
Picturesque (from Italian pittoresco through French)
Quattrocento (Italian Quattrocento from millequattrocento '1400') The culture of the 15th century
Studio

Colours
Orange
Lava (color)
Magenta
Rosso corsa
Sepia (from Italian seppia, meaning 'cuttlefish')
Sienna (from Italian terra di Siena 'soil of Siena')
Terra cotta (color)
Umber (from Latin umbra 'shadow', and the region of its origin, Umbria)

Cuisine
Al dente
Al fresco
Antipasto
Artichoke (from articiocco, Northern Italian variant of Old Italian arcicioffo)
Baguette (through French baguette from Italian bacchetta)
Banquet (from Italian banchetto through French)
Barista (from barista 'bartender'. A preparer of espresso-based coffee)
Bergamot (Italian: bergamotto)
Biscuit (through French from Italian biscotto, meaning 'cooked twice')
Bologna (after the Italian city)
Bruschetta
Broccoli (Italian: broccolo, pl. broccoli)
Candy (from Middle English sugre candy, part translation of Middle French sucre candi, from Old French çucre candi, part translation of Italian zucchero candito, from zucchero sugar + Arabic قاندل qandI candied, from Persian قند  qand cane sugar; ultimately from Sanskrit खुड् khanda 'piece of sugar', perhaps from Dravidian)
Cannelloni (Italian: cannellone, pl. cannelloni)
Cantaloupe (after the Italian village of Cantalupo in Sabina through French; in Italian the fruit is simply called melone or Cantalupo)
Cappuccino (from cappuccino 'little hood' or 'Capuchin'. A reference to the similarity between the drink's colour and that of the brown hoods of Capuchin friars)
Cauliflower (originally cole florye, from Italian cavolfiore meaning 'flowered cabbage' 
Chianti
Chipolata (from Italian cipolla, meaning 'onion')
Ciabatta (whose Italian basic meaning is 'slipper')
Coffee (from Italian caffè, from Turkish kahveh, and Arabic qahwah, perhaps from Kaffa region of Ethiopia, a home of the plant)
Espresso (from espresso 'expressed')
Fava
Frascati
Fusilli (Italian: fusillo, pl. fusilli; a derivative form of the word fuso, meaning 'spindle')
Gelatine (from Italian gelatina through French)
Gnocchi (Italian: gnocco, pl. gnocchi)
Gorgonzola (after the village near Milan)
Granita
Grappa
Gusto
Lasagne (Italian: lasagna, pl. lasagne)
Latte or caffè latte (Italian: caffellatte or caffè e latte 'coffee and milk')
Latte macchiato (Italian latte macchiato 'stained milk')
Macaroni (Italian maccherone, pl. maccheroni)
Macchiato or "caffè macchiato" (from macchiato 'stained', espresso coffee with a small dash of milk)
Maraschino
Marinate (Italian: marinare)
Marzipan (through German from Italian marzapane)
Martini cocktail (named after the famous brand of vermouth)
Minestrone
Mozzarella (from Italian mozzare 'to cut')
Muscat (through French from Italian moscato)
Orange (through French from Italian arancia, from Arabic naranj)
Panini (Italian: panino, pl. panini)
Parmesan (through French from Italian parmigiano, meaning 'from the city of Parma')
Pasta
Pepperoni (from Italian peperone, pl. peperoni, meaning 'bell pepper')
Pesto (from Italian pestare 'to crush (with mortar and pestle)')
Pistachio (Italian: pistacchio)
Pizza
Pizzeria
Polenta
Provolone
Radicchio
Ravioli
Risotto
Salami (Italian: salame, pl. salami)
Salumi (Italian pl. of salume 'salted meat')
Scampi (Italian: scampo, pl. scampi)
Semolina (Italian: semolino)
Sfogliatelle (Italian sfogliatella, pl. sfogliatelle; from sfoglia 'thin layer')
Sorbet (through French from Italian sorbetto, which in turn comes from Turkish, Persian and Arabic)
Spaghetti (Italian: spaghetto, pl. spaghetti)
Spumoni (Italian: spumone, pl. spumoni)
Sultana (in Italian is the female of 'sultan'; the grape is called sultanina)
Tagliatelle (from Italian tagliare 'to cut')
Tortellini (Italian tortellino, pl. tortellini)
Trattoria
Tutti frutti
Vermicelli
Vino
Zucchini (Italian: zucchina, pl. zucchine)

Clothes, accessories, furniture
Baldachin (from Italian baldacchino; Baldacco is an old Italian name for Baghdad)
Brocade (from Italian broccato through Spanish)
Costume (through French)
Jeans (after the city of Genoa through French Gênes)
Muslin (through French mousseline from Italian mussolina after the city of Mosul)
Organza (after the city of Urgenč)
Parasol (from Italian parasole through French)
Stiletto (in Italian it means 'little stylus' and refers to a type of thin, needle-pointed dagger, while the shoes are called tacchi a spillo, literally 'needle heels')
Umbrella (from Italian ombrello)
Valise (from Italian valigia through French)

Geography and geology
Archipelago (through Italian arcipelago, from Greek arkhipélagos) 
Lagoon (Italian: laguna)
Littoral (Italian: litorale)
Marina (from Italian mare 'sea')
Riviera (from Italian "riviera", coming from Latin ripa 'coastline')
Sirocco (Italian: scirocco, from Arabic)
Terra rossa

Some toponym of  Latin, Greek, Slavic or Arabic origin referring to non-Italian places entered English through Italian:
Aleppo
Angora
Cairo
Crimea
Monaco
Monte Carlo
Montenegro
Negroponte
Santorini
Tripoli
Valletta
Vienna

territories named after Italian explorers:
America after Amerigo Vespucci
Colombia after Christopher Columbus
British Columbia after Christopher Columbus

Commerce and finance
Bank (Italian: banco or banca) 
Bankrupt (Italian: bancarotta) 
Capitalism (from Italian capitale)
Carat / karat (from Italian carato – from Arabic – through French) 
Cartel (through French and German, from Italian cartello, meaning 'poster') 
Cash (from Italian cassa through French caisse and Provençal) 
Credit (from Italian credito through French) 
Del credere (Italian: star del credere)
Ducat (from Italian ducato, whose main meaning is 'duchy') 
Florin (through French from Italian fiorino) 
Finance (from Italian affinare, meaning 'do something precisely' in economy)
Lira
Lombard (through French, from Italian lombardo meaning an inhabitant of Lombardy or also Northern Italy) 
Mercantile (through French) 
Management (from Italian mano for maneggiamento, meaning 'hand' for "handlement") 
Merchandise (from Italian merce)
Money (from Italian moneta)
Ponzi scheme (from Charles Ponzi)
Post (from Italian posta through French poste)

Military and weaponry
Arsenal (Italian arsenale, from Arabic)
Brigade (through French from Italian brigata)
Brigand (through French from Italian brigante)
Cannon (through French from Italian cannone)
Cavalier (from Italian cavaliere)
Cavalry (through French cavalerie from Italian cavalleria)
Catapult (through Latin catapulta from Italian catapulta)
Citadel (through French citadelle from Italian cittadella)
Colonel (through French from Italian colonnello)
Condottieri (Italian condottiero, pl. condottieri)
Infantry (through French infanterie from Italian infanteria, Modern Italian: fanteria)
Generalissimo
Salvo (Italian salva)
Scimitar (through Italian scimitarra from ancient Persian shamshir)
Stiletto (Italian stiletto 'little stylus', an engraving tool)
Stratagem (through French stratagème from Italian stratagemma, in its turn from Latin and Greek)
Venture (Italian ventura)

Crime and immorality
Assassination (from Italian assassinio. The first to use this Italian word was William Shakespeare in Macbeth. Shakespeare introduced a lot of Italian or Latin words in English language. Assassin and assassination derive from the word hashshashin (Arabic: حشّاشين, ħashshāshīyīn, also hashishin, hashashiyyin, means Assassins), and shares its etymological roots with hashish. It referred to a group of Nizari Shia Persians who worked against various Arab and Persian targets.
Assassin (from Italian assassino)
Bandit (from Italian bandito)
Bordello
Casino (in Italian means 'hunting cottage' or 'brothel', and – figuratively – 'mess' or 'a lot')
Charlatan (through French from Italian ciarlatano)
Cosa nostra
Mafia and mafioso

Politics
Doge
Fascism (Italian: fascismo)
Fascist (Italian: fascista)
Ghetto
Machiavellian and Machiavellianism after Niccolò Machiavelli
Manifesto (meaning 'poster' in Italian)
Politico (meaning either 'political' or 'politician' in Italian)
Propaganda

Love and sex
Bimbo (from Italian bimbo 'child')
Casanova
Dildo (from Italian diletto, meaning 'pleasure')
Inamorata (from Italian innamorata, a female lover)
Ruffian (Italian: m. ruffiano, f. ruffiana)

Science and nature
Antenna
Belladonna
Cascade (from Italian cascata through French)
Flu (from influenza)
Influenza
Lava
Lazaret (Italian: lazzaretto)
Manganese
Malaria
Medico
Neutrino
Parma violet (Italian: violetta di Parma, after the city of Parma)
Pellagra
Quarantine (Italian: quarantena)
Saliva
Tarantula (through Medieval Latin from Italian tarantola, after the city of Taranto)
Volcano (Italian: vulcano derived from the name of Vulcano, a volcanic island in the Aeolian Islands, which in turn derives from Vulcanus, the Roman god of fire)
Zebra (through Portuguese)
Zero (from Arabic)

words after Italian scientist names:
Avogadro constant after Amedeo Avogadro
Eustachian tube after Bartolomeo Eustachi
Fermion, Fermium, Fermi (unit), Fermi level after Enrico Fermi
Fibonacci series after Leonardo Fibonacci
Galilean transformation after Galileo Galilei
Galvanic, Galvanize after Luigi Galvani
Marconi rig after Guglielmo Marconi
Lagrangian after Giuseppe Luigi Lagrangia
Pareto distribution after Vilfredo Pareto
Ricci curvature after Gregorio Ricci-Curbastro
Torr after Evangelista Torricelli
Venturi tube after Giovanni Battista Venturi
Volt after Alessandro Volta

Religion, rituals, holidays
Biretta (Italian: berretta)
Camerlengo
Carnival (through French from Italian carnevale)
Confetti (from Italian confetto, pl. confetti, meaning 'dragée'; in Italian confetti are called coriandoli)
Intaglio (burial mound) (from the art usage)
Masquerade (through French from Italian mascherata)
Monsignor (Italian: monsignore)
Padre (in Italian means 'father')
Promession (Italian promessa 'promise')

Games and sports
Catenaccio (from catenaccio 'door-bolt', a defensive tactic in association football)
Curva (a curved stadium grandstand)
Fianchetto (Italian fianchetto 'little flank', a chess tactic)
Lottery (Italian: lotteria)
Tarot (through French) and taroc (Italian tarocco)
Tifo (literally meaning 'typhus') and tifosi (from Italian tifosi 'sports fans', 'supporters')
Tombola
Zona mista (literally meaning 'mixed zone'; often referred to as "Gioco all'italiana" or "The Game in the Italian style")
Libero (from Italian libero 'free', a defensive specialist posit position in modern volleyball)

Others
Antenna
Armature (through Italian plural armature singular armatura, in English rebar, short for reinforcing bar)
Berlinetta (from berlinetta 'little saloon', a two-seater sports car)
Bravado (through French bravade from Italian bravata)
Brave (through French from Italian bravo)
 Capisci ('understand', second-person imperative form of capire, often misspelled kapish, or kapeesh)
Ciao (from ciao, an informal greeting or valediction, originally from Venetian sciavo '(your humble) servant'
de)
Cognoscente (from Italian conoscente, Italian: conoscitore)
Dilemma (Italian dilemma from Greek dilemmaton)
Dilettante (in Italian means 'amateur')
Ditto
Genoa after the city
Gonzo (in Italian means 'simpleton', 'diddled') 
Humanist (through French from Italian umanista)
Inferno (in Italian means 'hell')
Latrine (through Italian plural latrine from Latin lavatrina)
Lido (in Italian means 'coast', usually 'sandy coast')
Lipizzan (Italian: lipizzano)
Major-domo (Italian: maggiordomo)
Mizzen (through French misaine from Italian mezzana)
Nostalgia (with the same meaning in Italian)
Paparazzi (Italian paparazzi, plural of paparazzo, the name of a character in the film La Dolce Vita)
Pococurante (from poco 'little' and curante 'caring')
Poltroon (through French poltron from Italian poltrona)
Pronto
Regatta (Italian: regata)
Vendetta (in Italian means 'vengeance')
Vista (in Italian means 'sight')
Viva

Sources
D. Harper, Online Etymology Dictionary

See also
wiktionary:Category:English terms derived from Italian
List of Italian musical terms used in English

Notes

References

 
Italian words and phrases
Italian culture-related lists